The golden-haired miner bee (Andrena auricoma) is a species of miner bee in the family Andrenidae. The female bees are 8 to 10 mm in length, and males are 6 to 9 mm long. It is found in the western United States, and is relatively rare outside California. It looks very similar to the death camas miner bee (Andrena astragali) but is smaller.

References

Further reading

 
 
 

auricoma
Insects described in 1879